Slavomír Bališ (born 26 September 1985) is a Slovak football midfielder who recently played for the 3. liga club FKM Nové Zámky, on loan from FC Nitra.

References

External links
 at fcnitra.sk 

1985 births
Living people
Slovak footballers
Association football midfielders
FC Nitra players
FK Bodva Moldava nad Bodvou players
Slovak Super Liga players